The Voderberg tiling is a mathematical spiral tiling, invented in 1936 by mathematician  (1911-1945). It is a monohedral tiling: it consists of only one shape that tessellates the plane with congruent copies of itself. In this case, the prototile is an elongated irregular nonagon, or nine-sided figure. The most interesting feature of this polygon is the fact that two copies of it can fully enclose a third one. E.g., the lowest purple nonagon is enclosed by two yellow ones, all three of identical shape. Before Voderberg's discovery, mathematicians had questioned whether this could be possible.

Because it has no translational symmetries, the Voderberg tiling is technically non-periodic, even though it exhibits an obvious repeating pattern. This tiling was the first spiral tiling to be devised, preceding later work by Branko Grünbaum and Geoffrey C. Shephard in the 1970s. A spiral tiling is depicted on the cover of Grünbaum and Shephard's  1987 book Tilings and Patterns.

References

External links 
 

Tessellation
Spirals